WBUB-LP (96.1 FM, "The Branch 96.1 FM") is a radio station licensed to serve the community of Portsmouth, New Hampshire. The station is owned by Cultural Media Connection and airs a contemporary Christian music format.

The station was assigned the WBUB-LP call letters by the Federal Communications Commission on February 7, 2014.

References

External links
 Official Website
 FCC Public Inspection File for WBUB-LP
 

BUB-LP
Radio stations established in 2014
2014 establishments in New Hampshire
Contemporary Christian radio stations in the United States
Rockingham County, New Hampshire
BUB-LP